Yuroke is a bounded rural locality in Victoria, Australia,  north-west of Melbourne's Central Business District, located within the City of Hume local government area.

Yuroke is located adjacent to the Melbourne Metropolitan Area, beyond the Urban Growth Boundary. It is located between Mickleham and Greenvale, on Mickleham Road.

History

Yuroke gets its name from an Indigenous word, "Eurok Iguana", the meaning of which remains unclear.

Yuroke Post Office opened around 1902 and closed in 1975.

Yuroke was the filming location for Melbourne band Painters & Dockers' single Nude School.

See also
 Shire of Bulla – Yuroke was previously within this former local government area.
 former Electoral district of Yuroke

References

City of Hume